Chaeryong River is a left tributary of the Taedong River. It is navigable in its lower portion and provides sea access to Sariwon.

References

Rivers of North Korea